Chermaine Shannon (born 24 December 1977) is a Namibian professional racing cyclist. In 2007, she won the Namibian National Road Race Championships.

References

External links
 

1977 births
Living people
Namibian female cyclists
Place of birth missing (living people)
20th-century Namibian women
21st-century Namibian women